The Peruvian civil war of 1884–1885 was an internal Peruvian conflict that resulted from Peru's defeat in the War of the Pacific. The casus belli was the Treaty of Ancón.

Caceres' final assault and capture of Lima
On November 28, 1885, Caceres and his forces appeared outside Lima and launched their final assault. By this time, the people of Lima welcomed Caceres and joined him. Fighting between Caceres' and Iglesias' forces continued into November 29 and 30. On December 3, 1885, with his control of Lima reduced to only the Government Palace, Iglesias resigned and went into exile.

Bibliography
 Basadre Grohmann, Jorge: Historia de la Republic of Peru. 1822 - 1933, Octava Edición, corregida y aumentada. Tomo 8. Editada por el Diario "La República" de Lima y la Universidad "Ricardo Palma". Impreso en Santiago de Chile, 1998.
 : Historia de la Republic (1821-1930). Tomo I. Lima, AFA Editores Importadores S.A., 1985.
 Guerra, Margarita: Historia General del Peru. La República Aristocrática. Tomo XI. Primera Edición. Editor Carlos Milla Batres. Lima, Peru, 1984. Depósito Legal: B. 22436-84 (XI).
 : Enciclopedia Ilustrada del Peru. Tercera Edición. Tomo 8, HAB/IZQ. Artículo: HUARIPAMPA. Lima, PEISA, 2001. 

Wars involving Peru
Conflicts in 1884
Conflicts in 1885